Paper Blood is the eighth studio album released by the band Royal Hunt. It is the first album without longtime members Jacob Kjaer and Steen Mogensen who both left the band in December 2003, It is also the last studio album to feature John West on vocals.

Track listing
All songs written by André Andersen.

 "Break Your Chains" – 5:33
 "Not My Kind" – 6:21
 "Memory Lane" (Instrumental) – 5:20
 "Never Give Up" – 5:32
 "Seven Days" – 6:22
 "SK 983" (Instrumental) – 4:41
 "Kiss of Faith" – 5:19
 "Paper Blood" – 5:08
 "Season's Change" – 4:55
 "Twice Around the World" (Instrumental) – 7:15

Personnel
André Andersen – keyboards and bass guitar
John West – vocals
Marcus Jidell – guitars
Allan Sørensen  – drums

with

Kenneth Olsen – percussion
Kenny Lubcke – backing vocals
Maria McTurk – backing vocals
Soma Allpas – cello
Peter Brander – dobro

Additional Info
Mixed by Lars Overgaard at EMI/Medley Studio
Mastered by Jan Eliasson at Tocano Mastering
Illustration by Carlos Del Olmo Hlmberg
Layout by Christina Laugesen

References

Royal Hunt albums
2005 albums
Frontiers Records albums